Four Seasons Hotel Chicago is a hotel in Chicago, Illinois, United States.  It is part of Toronto-based Four Seasons Hotels and Resorts. The hotel occupies the 30th through 46th floors of the 900 North Michigan building on the Magnificent Mile overlooking Lake Michigan.

History 
Four Seasons Hotel Chicago, which first opened in 1989, currently houses 345 guest rooms and offers views of Lake Michigan or the Chicago skyline from the 30th to 46th floors of the tower.

Rating

Four Seasons Hotel Chicago has been receiving the AAA Five Diamond Award since 1990. It was ranked No. 5 in the U.S. News & World Report's 2019 list for the best hotels in the U.S., jumping from No. 12 in 2018. It has been receiving a Forbes Travel Guide (formerly Mobil Guide) 5-Star rating since 1996.

Filming location
The pool scene in Home Alone 2: Lost in New York, set in New York City, was filmed here.

References

External links
 Four Seasons Hotel Chicago

Skyscraper hotels in Chicago
Four Seasons hotels and resorts
Hotel buildings completed in 1989
1989 establishments in Illinois